Gideon Wahlberg (18 June 1890 – 3 May 1948) was a Swedish actor, screenwriter, film director and theater manager. Wahlberg directed six films including South of the Highway (1936).

Wahlberg was the theater manager of the Arbisteatern in Norrköping from 1918-1931 and 1933–1934.

Biography 
Wahlberg was the son of a tailor and grew up with several siblings in Östermalm in Stockholm. He made his stage debut as a 15-year-old and was director of the Arbisteatern in Norrköping 1918-1931 and 1933-1934. He wrote about 25 comedies, several of them were filmed or became TV series the most famous is Söderkåkar. Between 1924 and 1947, nineteen of his plays were performed at Tantolunden's open-air theater, where he was director together with Thyra Janse-Juberg from 1933 to 1948. Wahlberg also wrote lyrics and melodies for Ernst Rolf's revues.

Gideon Wahlberg was married twice, the first time to the actress Aida Leipziger, the stepdaughter of the revue writer Harald Leipziger, and the second time to the actress Lilly Föll. With Aida he had a son Herbert in 1912, Gulldis in 1919 and Ingalill in 1928. In his marriage to Lilly he had a son Anders.

Walhlberg founded the fraternity Thalia's Friends in Norrköping in 1922, and was called "Norrköping's Shakespeare". He is buried in Norra kyrkogården in Norrköping.

Selected filmography

Actor

 Carolina Rediviva (1920) - Student
 Janne Modig (1923) - Friman
 The Devil and the Smalander (1927) - Navvy
Love and the Home Guard (1931) - Filip Andersson
 Ett skepp kommer lastat (1932) - Show Artiste
 The Southsiders (1932) - Johan Jansson
 Två hjärtan och en skuta (1932) - Napoleon Svensson
 Saturday Nights (1933) - Johan
 Flickorna från Gamla sta'n (1934) - Johan Wellberg
 The Women Around Larsson (1934) - Johan Jansson
 Close Relations (1935) - Johan Jansson
 Larsson i andra giftet (1935) - Johan Kindberg
 Skärgårdsflirt (1935) - Österman
 Flickor på fabrik (1935) - Larsson
 Skicka hem Nr. 7 (1937) - Guest at the major's 70th birthday (uncredited)
 Vi som går scenvägen (1938) - Johan
 Romans (1940) - Karlsson
 The Ghost Reporter (1941) - Night Editor
 Lasse-Maja (1941) - Inn Keeper
 Sexlingar (1942) - Screenwriter (uncredited)
 Adventurer (1942) - Inn-keeper (uncredited)
 Elvira Madigan (1943) - Member of Circus Orchestra (uncredited)
 In Darkest Smaland (1943) - Policeman
 Sonja (1943) - Lindgren's Fellow-worker (uncredited)
 Försök inte med mej..! (1946) - Farmer (uncredited)
 Saltstänk och krutgubbar (1946) - Parish Constable (final film role)

Director
 South of the Highway (1936)
 Baldwin's Wedding (1938)

References

Bibliography 
 Larsson, Mariah & Marklund, Anders. Swedish Film: An Introduction and Reader. Nordic Academic Press, 2010.

External links 
 

1890 births
1948 deaths
Swedish male film actors
Swedish male silent film actors
20th-century Swedish male actors
Swedish male screenwriters
Swedish film directors
Male actors from Stockholm
20th-century Swedish screenwriters
20th-century Swedish male writers